is a Japanese manga series written by Kyoichi Nanatsuki and illustrated by Teppei Sugiyama. It was serialized in Shogakukan's shōnen manga magazine Weekly Shōnen Sunday from November 2017 to July 2019, with its chapters collected in eight tankōbon volumes.

Publication
Written by Kyoichi Nanatsuki and illustrated by Teppei Sugiyama, Tantei Xeno to Nanatsu no Satsujin Misshitsu was serialized in Shogakukan's shōnen manga magazine Weekly Shōnen Sunday from November 29, 2017, to July 17, 2019. Shogakukan collected its chapters in eight tankōbon volumes, released from April 18, 2018, to September 18, 2019.

Volume list

See also
Project ARMS, another manga series written by Nanatsuki
Area D, another manga series written by Nanatsuki

References

External links
 

Detective anime and manga
Shogakukan manga
Shōnen manga